The 1989–90 Boston Bruins season was the Bruins' 66th season. The season culminated with their participation in the Stanley Cup finals.

Offseason

NHL draft

Regular season
The Bruins concluded the regular season with the best defensive corps in the league, with just 232 goals allowed. They also allowed the fewest power-play goals (53), the fewest short-handed goals (3) and tied the Washington Capitals for the most shutouts (5). The Bruins managed to secure the Presidents' Trophy with just 101 points, the fewest ever for a Presidents' Trophy winner in a non-lockout-shortened season.

Final standings

Schedule and results

Player statistics

Regular season
Scoring

Goaltending

Playoffs
Scoring

Goaltending

Playoffs

Adams Division Semifinals

Adams Division Finals

Wales Conference Finals

Stanley Cup finals
In Game 1, Petr Klima scored at 15:13 of the third overtime period to give the Oilers a 3–2 win; this game remains the longest in Stanley Cup Finals history (Longest NHL overtime games), edging both Brett Hull's cup-winner in 1999 and Igor Larionov's game-winner in 2002 by less than 30 seconds. In game five at the Boston Garden on May 24, the Oilers won 4–1. Craig Simpson scored the game-winning goal. Oilers goaltender Bill Ranford was awarded the Conn Smythe Trophy as Playoff MVP.

Boston Bruins vs. Edmonton Oilers

Awards and records
 Presidents Trophy
 Prince of Wales Trophy
 James Norris Memorial Trophy: Ray Bourque
 William M. Jennings Trophy: Rejean Lemelin/Andy Moog

References
 Bruins on Hockey Database

Presidents' Trophy seasons
Adams Division champion seasons
Boston Bruins seasons
Boston Bruins
Boston Bruins
Eastern Conference (NHL) championship seasons
Boston Bruins
Boston Bruins
Boston Bruins
Bruins
Bruins